The Harshaville Covered Bridge is a historic covered bridge spanning the Cherry Fork Creek at Harshaville, Adams County, Ohio.  Built in 1855, it is a Burr truss bridge with a 110-foot span.  It has sheet metal siding, a metal roof and stone abutments.  It was listed on the National Register of Historic Places in 1976.

The Ohio Historic Places Dictionary has described it as "an outstanding example" of a Burr truss bridge.  The name reflects the community, which was named for the Harsha family that built a mill there.  In the summer of 1863, in a campaign known as Morgan's Raid, raiders from the Confederate States Army led by John Hunt Morgan ransacked the Harshaville general store and burned many bridges, but spared the Harshaville Covered Bridge.

In June 2010, the Ohio Department of Transportation received a $100,000 grant from the Federal Highway Administration to rehabilitate the bridge.  The County planned to replace the bridge's metal siding with historically correct wood siding and to replace the metal roof and failed backwall.  Tom Cross, executive director of the Adams County Travel and Visitor's Bureau, noted, "Once this work is completed, this bridge will look like new."

References

National Register of Historic Places in Adams County, Ohio
Buildings and structures in Adams County, Ohio
Transportation in Adams County, Ohio
Tourist attractions in Adams County, Ohio